Charles Beauclerk, 1st Duke of St Albans, KG (8 May 167010 May 1726) was an illegitimate son of King Charles II of England by his mistress Nell Gwyn.

Biography

On 21 December 1676, a warrant was passed for "a grant to Charles Beauclerc, the King's natural son, and to the heirs male of his body, of the dignities of Baron of Heddington, co. Oxford, and Earl of Burford in the same county, with remainder to his brother, James Beauclerc, and the heirs male of his body." A few weeks later, James was given "the title of Lord Beauclerc, with the place and precedence of the eldest son of an earl." 
Just after the death of Henry Jermyn, 1st Earl of St Albans, at the turn of the year, on 5 January 1684, King Charles granted his son Charles, Earl of Burford, the title of Duke of St Albans, gave him an allowance of £1,000 a year, and granted him the offices of Chief Ranger of Enfield Chace and Master of the Hawks in reversion (i. e. after the death of the current incumbents). He became colonel in the 8th regiment of horse in 1687, and served with the emperor Leopold I, being present at the siege of Belgrade in 1688.

When his mother died (14 November 1687), Beauclerk received a large estate, including Burford House, near Windsor Castle. After the Battle of Landen in 1693, William III made Beauclerk captain of the gentlemen pensioners, and four years later gentleman of the bedchamber.  His father had given him the reversion of the office of Hereditary Master Falconer and that of Hereditary Registrar of the Court of Chancery, which fell vacant in 1698.  His Whig sentiments prevented his advancement under Queen Anne, but he was restored to favour at the accession of King George I. In 1718, George made him a Knight of the Garter.

Beauclerk died at Bath two days after his 56th birthday and is buried in Westminster Abbey. He was succeeded by his eldest son.

Marriage and issue

On 17 April 1694 he married Lady Diana de Vere, daughter and sole heiress of Aubrey de Vere, 20th Earl of Oxford. She was a well-known beauty, who became lady of the bedchamber to Caroline of Ansbach, Princess of Wales. By his wife he had twelve children:

Sons
Charles Beauclerk, 2nd Duke of St Albans (6 April 169627 July 1751), eldest son and heir;
Lord William Beauclerk (22 May 169823 February 1733 N.S.)
Admiral Vere Beauclerk, 1st Baron Vere (14 July 169921 October 1781)
Colonel Lord Henry Beauclerk (11 August 17015 January 1761)
Lord Sidney Beauclerk (27 February 170323 November 1744)
Lieutenant-General Lord George Beauclerk (26 December 170411 May 1768)
Lord Seymour Beauclerk (born 24 June 1708c. 1709)
Rev. Lord James Beauclerk (c. 170920 October 1787); was Bishop of Hereford (1746–1787)
Lord Aubrey Beauclerk (c. 171022 March 1741), became a captain in the Royal Navy, and died at the Battle of Cartagena de Indias.

Daughters
Lady Diana Beauclerk (born c. 1697)
Lady Mary Beauclerk (born c. 1712)
Lady Anne Beauclerk (born c. 1714)

Earl of Burford
Several legends describe how Beauclerk became Earl of Burford. The first is that on arrival of the King, his mother said, "Come here, you little bastard, and greet your father." When the king rebuked her for calling him that, she replied, "Your Majesty has given me no other name to call him by." In response, Charles created him Earl of Burford.

Another legend is that Beauclerk's mother held him out of a window (or above a river) and threatened to drop him unless he was given a peerage. Charles supposedly cried out "God save the Earl of Burford!" and subsequently created that peerage.

References

John H[arold] Wilson: Nell Gwyn: Royal Mistress (Dell Publishing Company, Inc., New York, 1952)

External links

|-

1670 births
1726 deaths
17th-century English nobility
18th-century English people
101
Charles
Illegitimate children of Charles II of England
Peers of England created by Charles II
Knights of the Garter
Lord-Lieutenants of Berkshire
People from Windsor, Berkshire
C
Honourable Corps of Gentlemen at Arms
Fellows of the Royal Society
Burials at Westminster Abbey
Sons of kings